Marie-Lydie Bonfils, née Cabanis, (1837-1918) was the first professional woman photographer in the Middle East. Originally from France, she was active in Lebanon and neighbouring areas of the Ottoman Empire in the late 19th and the early 20th centuries. Lydie and her husband, Félix Bonfils, established "Maison Bonfils", the first and, at the time, most successful photographic studio in Beirut.

Early and Family Life 

Lydie married Félix Bonfils on the 27th August 1857 in Crespian. Their children, Félicité-Sophie and Paul Félix Adrien (known as Adrien), were born in 1858 and 1861 respectively in Saint-Hippolyte-du-Fort. 
Félix was originally a bookbinder but, when France intervened in the 1860 civil war between Christians and Druze in the Middle East, he was a part of the military expedition. Lydie was enamoured by the tales of Lebanon Félix told on his return.

Félix is said to have been taught heliogravure printing by Abel Niépce de Saint-Victor and, by 1864, he was running a printing office in Alès.

When Adrien became dangerously ill with whooping cough, it was thought that a change in climate would cause him to improve. So, it was decided that Lydie would take Adrien to Beirut to recover, due to Félix's fond memories of Lebanon and Lydie's desire to see the area. The trip was a great success and, in 1867, the whole family moved from France to Beirut.

Career 
Once in Beirut, the Bonfils opened a photographic studio, "Maison Bonfils", located on the rue George Picot. Maison Bonfils produced studio portraits, staged biblical scenes, landscapes, and panoramic photographs.

Lydie was heavily involved in administrative duties, which expanded when the business opened studios in Cairo and Alexandria, with connections to a New York agency. She was also involved in preparing the albumen for prints. This involved separating the egg white from the yolk, which could be a lengthy and unpleasant process. According to Adrien's son, Roger Bonfils, when she was boarding the evacuation ship to leave Beirut in 1916, Lydie exclaimed, "I don't want to smell another egg again!".

Although the early photographs from Maison Bonfils have been generally attributed to Félix alone, the involvement of Lydie and Adrien in the photography side of the business is now recognised. They also had an unidentified number of assistants. Photographers in the area found it difficult to find people willing to be photographed, partly due to local religious and cultural concerns about photography, and this applied particularly to women. As a woman, Lydie is said to have been a more acceptable photographer for Middle Eastern women. As the region was thought to be too dangerous for Lydie to take photographs outside of the studio, her work was likely limited to studio portraits. However, there is may be evidence that she was responsible for some landscape photographs, as English clergyman Samuel Manning cites "Madame Bonfils of Beyrout" as a photographic source for the illustrations of Palestine in his 1874 book.

Lydie ran the studio in Félix's absence when he returned to Alès in 1876 to publish compilations of his photographs. In 1878, the name of the studio was changed to "F. Bonfils et Cie". Adrien, now back in Beirut after completing his studies in France, took more responsibility for photography during this time. Félix again travelled to Alès to establish a collotype printing factory in 1880 and died there in 1885.

Adrien remained at the studio until the early 1900s, when he left to open a hotel in Brummana. With the assistance of fellow photographer Abraham Guiragossian, Lydie continued to manage the studio after the departure of Adrien. In 1907, Lydie published a collection of photographs from the studio in the Catalogue général des vues photographiques de l’Orient.

Lydie's career was halted by the Ottoman Empire entering the First World War. She was evacuated with her family to Cairo, where she died and was buried in 1918. After Lydie's death, Guiragossian purchased Maison Bonfils and the Bonfils' archives. Lydie's connection to the studio remained, however, as he signed his photographs, "Lydie Bonfils photographe, Beyrouth (Syrie) successeur A. Guiragossian."

Selected photographs from Maison Bonfils 
The Bonfils' archive has been digitised in a project between the British Library Endangered Archives Programme and the Jafet Memorial Library, American University of Beirut, in 2013. The collection is available online at the Endangered Archives Programme website.

References 

1837 births
1918 deaths
19th-century French photographers
Photography in Lebanon
Pioneers of photography
Early photographers in Palestine
French women photographers
19th-century women artists
19th-century women photographers
French women artists
20th-century women photographers
20th-century photographers
19th-century photographers
Landscape photographers
Portrait photographers